The 2000–01 season was Real Madrid Club de Fútbol's 70th season in La Liga. This article lists all matches that the club played in the 2000–01 season, and also shows statistics of the club's players.

Summary 
This was the season where the club won its 28th La Liga title, having begun a new policy of signing the world's greatest players under a new president, Florentino Pérez, with a goal of making Real Madrid the most fashionable club in the world. Luís Figo was the arrival of the year, along with Claude Makélélé, and they helped a team of stars, dubbed the galácticos, win the league under Vicente del Bosque, as well as reaching the UEFA Champions League semi-finals as defending champions, where they were narrowly knocked out by Bayern Munich. The arrival of Luís Figo in July 2000 was controversial due to his move from Barcelona to Real Madrid, thus generating furious reactions from Barcelona fans and also Boixos Nois hooligans.

Overview

Transfers

In

Total spending:  €122 million

Competitions

La Liga

Classification

Results summary

Results by round

Matches

Copa del Rey

Champions League

First group stage

Group A

Second group stage

Group D

Knockout stage

Quarter-finals

Semi-finals

UEFA Super Cup

Intercontinental Cup

Statistics

Players statistics

External links

Real Madrid CF seasons
Real Madrid
2000–01